Buki may refer to:

 Buki (musical instrument), a brass instrument from Georgia
 Be (Cyrillic), formerly named Buki, a letter of the Cyrillic alphabet

See also 
 Bukki, a Biblical character
 Buke (disambiguation)